Nigrohydnum is a fungal genus in the order Polyporales. It contain a single species, Nigrohydnum nigrum, a rare toothed polypore known from only a few collections in Brazil.

Description
The fruit body of the fungus is characterized by its purplish-black, semicircular caps with spines on the cap underside. The spines on the cap underside are up to 3 mm long, and are densely packed, numbering about 1–3 per millimetre. Nigrohydnum has a dimitic hyphal system, containing both generative hyphae with clamp connections and skeletal hyphae. The spores of Nigrohydnum nigrum are cylindrical, thin-walled, hyaline, and measure 4.5–2 μm. They are inamyloid.

Distribution
The type of the fungus was collected in Serra do Aracá State Park, in the state of Amazonas, Brazil. It was later reported from Paraná.  After an old voucher specimen was discovered in a herbarium and identified to be N. nigrum, the geographic distribution was extended to the Atlantic rainforest of Porto Alegre, Rio Grande do Sul state, in Southern Brazil.

References

Fungi of South America
Polyporales
Monotypic Polyporales genera
Taxa described in 1987
Taxa named by Leif Ryvarden